Lake City is a former railroad depot located on Rice Avenue in Lake City, Pennsylvania. The station opened in 1852, and a freight depot once stood across the tracks on Railroad Street.

History

The depot served the Water Level Route of the New York Central Railroad and its predecessors for more than 100 years. The depot also served the Pittsburgh–Erie trains of the Pennsylvania Railroad, the NYCR's main competitor. While the station was located in the village of Miles Grove, the Girard name stuck until the 1950s, presumably due to the proximity of the village of Girard or being within Girard Township. After the end of service in the late 1950s, the station sat unused until it was repurposed as a diner in 1993. The diner is currently known as the All Aboard Dinor.

References

External links
Map of Erie County, PA - 1855

Railway stations in the United States opened in 1852
Former railway stations in Pennsylvania
Former New York Central Railroad stations
Former Pennsylvania Railroad stations
Railway stations closed in 1957
1852 establishments in Pennsylvania
1957 disestablishments in Pennsylvania